Woodstock – Back to the Garden: 50th Anniversary Experience is a live album by various artists, packaged as a box set of ten compact discs. Released by Rhino Records during the summer leading up to the fiftieth anniversary of the Woodstock Music and Art Fair, it contains selections from every performance at the music festival, which took place on August 15–18, 1969, in Bethel, New York. The discs also include stage announcements and miscellaneous audio material. The package contains essays by producer Andy Zax and Jesse Jarnow, details about the performers and notable festival figures, and photographs. This box set is a compilation derived from its limited edition parent box set. A smaller three-CD or five-LP sampler was also released.

Background
Although expanded issue sets from the festival had appeared for the 25th anniversary in 1994 and the 40th anniversary in 2009, this set proved more ambitious both in method and scope. Producer and archivist Zax spent more than a decade putting it together from hundreds of tapes that had never been consolidated in one place. In the process of reconstructing the festival for these sets, Zax corrected for some flaws in how the music was issued earlier. To wit:

These recordings have suffered a lot of indignities over the years: bad mixes, poor mastering, vocal and instrumental overdubs, rerecordings, sweetenings, deceptive edits, fake applause, fake cricket noises, fake rain chants, fake audience members yelling along with 'The Fish Cheer,' and entirely fraudulent tracks recorded at [other locations]...

Zax, along with mix engineer Brian Kehew and mastering engineer Dave Schultz, referred to photographic documentation which allowed them to situate the performers within the mix based on where they were standing onstage. Although efforts were undertaken to limit any interference in the original sound of the tapes, Zax and the production team were able to turn the surviving mono recording by Ravi Shankar into a true stereo mix.

Content
Unlike previous collations on record of music from the Woodstock Festival and like its parent box, 50th Anniversary Experience presents music from every performer and in the correct order chronologically they appeared over the course of the festival's three days. Discs one and two include all eight of the mostly folk artists who performed on the first day, starting Friday, August 15. The 14 performers from the second day, starting in the afternoon of Saturday, August 16, commence with the final performers on disc two Quill and end with the first performers on disc seven, Jefferson Airplane. The ten performers on the third and final day starting in the afternoon of Sunday, August 17, continue on the rest of disc seven through disc ten. One artist, Country Joe McDonald, appears twice having played a solo set on day two and another set with his band on day three.

Of the 162 tracks on the set, 117 are musical performances. Interspersed among the musical numbers are stage announcements comprising the remaining 45 tracks, mostly by the festival's unofficial mc's Chip Monck and John Morris. Farmer Max Yasgur, upon whose farm the festival took place, addresses the assembled crowd on day three. Also included is the 'confrontation' between Who guitarist Pete Townshend and activist Abbie Hoffman, the latter interrupting the Who's set to pontificate upon the prison sentence of White Panther John Sinclair. The edit for the performance of "The Star-Spangled Banner" into "Purple Haze" by Jimi Hendrix seems to duplicate that found on the original soundtrack album. Although not appearing at the festival, the presence of counterculture icons Bob Dylan and The Beatles is felt via songs covered in this box set — five artists sing Dylan songs, and three sing the Beatles.

Track listing

Disc one – Richie Havens, Sweetwater, Bert Sommer, Tim Hardin

Disc two – Ravi Shankar, Melanie, Arlo Guthrie, Joan Baez, Quill

Disc three – Country Joe McDonald, Santana, John Sebastian, Keef Hartley Band

Disc four – The Incredible String Band, Canned Heat

Disc five – Mountain, Grateful Dead, Creedence Clearwater Revival

Disc six – Janis Joplin, Sly and the Family Stone, The Who

Disc seven – Jefferson Airplane, Joe Cocker

Disc eight – Country Joe and the Fish, Ten Years After, The Band

Disc nine – Johnny Winter, Blood Sweat & Tears, Crosby Stills Nash & Young

Disc ten – Paul Butterfield Blues Band, Sha Na Na, Jimi Hendrix

Personnel

Musical artists
Richie Havens — vocal, guitar; Paul 'Deano' Williams — guitar, vocal; Daniel Ben Zebulon — congas
Sweetwater Nansi Nevins — vocal, guitar; Albert Moore — flute, vocal; August Burns — cello; Alex del Zoppo — keyboards, vocal; R.G. Carlyle — electric guitar, bongos, vocal; Fred Herrera — electric bass, vocal; Alan Malarowitz — drums; Elpidio 'Pete' Cobian — congas
Bert Sommer — vocal, guitar; Ira Stone — electric guitar, organ, harmonica; Charlie Bilello — bass
Tim Hardin — vocal, guitar; Richard Bock — cello; Gilles Malkine — guitar; Ralph Towner — guitar, piano; Glen Moore — bass; Muruga Booker — drums
Ravi Shankar — sitar; Alla Rakha — tabla; Maya Kulkami — tambura
Melanie Safka — vocal, guitar
Arlo Guthrie — vocal, guitar; John Pilla — guitar; Bob Arkin — bass; Paul Motian — drums
Joan Baez — vocal, guitar; Richard Festinger — guitar; on "Drug Store Truck Drivin' Man" Jeffrey Shurtlieff — vocal, guitar
Quill Dan Cole — vocal; Phil Thayer — keyboards, saxophone, flute; Norman Rogers — guitar, vocal; Jon Cole — bass, vocal; Roger North — drums
Country Joe McDonald — vocal, guitar
Santana Gregg Rolie — keyboards, vocal; Carlos Santana — guitar; David Brown — bass; Michael Shrieve — drums; José Areas, Mike Carabello — timbales, congas, percussion
John Sebastian — vocal, guitar
Keef Hartley Band Henry Lowther — trumpet, violin; Jimmy Jewell — saxophone; Miller Anderson — guitar, vocal; Gary Thain — bass; Keef Hartley — drums
The Incredible String Band Mike Heron — vocal, guitar, piano, various; Robin Williamson — vocal, guitar, piano, violin; Christina 'Licorice' McKechnie — organ, vocal; Rose Simpson — bass, recorder, vocal, percussion
Canned Heat Bob Hite — vocal, harmonica; Alan Wilson — vocal, guitar, harmonica; Harvey Mandel — guitar; Larry Taylor — bass; Adolpho de la Parra — drums
Mountain Leslie West — vocal, guitar; Steve Knight — keyboards; Felix Pappalardi — bass; Norman 'N.D.' Smart — drums
The Grateful Dead Jerry Garcia, Bob Weir — vocals, guitars; Ron 'Pigpen' McKernan, Tom Constanten — keyboards, vocals; Phil Lesh — bass; Mickey Hart, Bill Kreutzmann — drums
Creedence Clearwater Revival John Fogerty — vocal, guitar, harmonica; Tom Fogerty — rhythm guitar, vocal; Stu Cook — bass; Doug 'Cosmo' Clifford — drums
Janis Joplin — vocal; Luis Gasca — trumpet; Terry Clements — tenor saxophone; Cornelius 'Snooky' Flowers — baritone saxophone, vocal; Richard Kermode — keyboards; John Till - guitar; Brad Campbell — bass; Maury Baker — drums
Sly and the Family Stone Cynthia Robinson — trumpet; Jerry Martini — saxophone; Sly Stone — vocal, keyboards; Rose Stone — keyboards, vocal; Freddie Stone — guitar, vocal; Larry Graham — bass, vocal; Gregg Errico — drums
The Who Roger Daltrey — vocal; Pete Townshend — guitar, vocal; John Entwistle — bass, vocal; Keith Moon — drums
Jefferson Airplane Marty Balin, Grace Slick — vocals; Nicky Hopkins — piano; Paul Kantner, Jorma Kaukonen — guitars, vocals; Jack Casady — bass; Spencer Dryden — drums
Joe Cocker — vocal; Chris Stainton — keyboards; Henry McCullough — guitar, vocal; Alan Spenner — bass, vocal; Bruce Rowland — drums
Country Joe and the Fish Country Joe McDonald — vocal, guitar; Mark Kapner, Barry Melton — guitars; Doug Metzner — bass; Greg Dewey — drums
Ten Years After Alvin Lee — vocal, guitar; Chick Churchill — keyboards; Leo Lyons — bass; Ric Lee — drums
The Band Richard Manuel — vocal, piano, organ; Garth Hudson — organ, piano; Robbie Robertson — guitar, vocal; Rick Danko — vocal, bass; Levon Helm — vocal, drums
Johnny Winter — vocal, guitar; Tommy Shannon — bass; John Turner — drums
Blood, Sweat & Tears Lew Soloff, Chuck Winfield — trumpets, flugelhorns; Jerry Hyman — trombone; Fred Lipsius — alto saxophone, piano; Dick Halligan — keyboards, trombone, flute; David Clayton-Thomas, Steve Katz — vocals, guitars; Jim Fielder — bass; Bobby Colomby — drums
Crosby, Stills, Nash & Young David Crosby, Graham Nash — vocals, guitars; Stephen Stills, Neil Young — vocals, guitars, organ; Greg Reeves — bass; Dallas Taylor — drums
Paul Butterfield Blues Band Keith Johnson, Steve Madaio — trumpets; David Sanborn, Trevor Lawrence — saxophones; Gene Dinwiddie — vocal, tenor saxophone; Paul Butterfield — vocal, harmonica; Howard 'Buzzy' Feiten — guitar; Rod Hicks — bass; Phillip Wilson — drums
Sha Na Na Alan Cooper, Dave Garrett, Frederick 'Dennis' Greene, Richard Joffe, Rob Leonard, Scott Powell, Donny York — vocals; Joe Witkin — keyboards; Elliot Cahn, Henry Gross — guitars; Bruce Clarke III — bass; Jocko Marcellino — drums
Jimi Hendrix — vocal, guitar; Larry Lee — rhythm guitar; Billy Cox — bass, vocal; Mitch Mitchell — drums; Juma Sultan — percussion; Jerry Velez — congas

Production
 Andy Zax, Steve Woolard, Brian Kehew — reissue producers
 Eddie Kramer, Lee Osborne — original location recording engineers
 Dave Schulz, James Clarke, Mike Sawitzke — mastering and mixing engineers
 Suzanne Savage — project supervision
 Mike Engstrom, Shannon Ward — product and packaging managers
 Sheryl Farber, Allison Boron — editorial supervisors
 Lisa Glines, Masaki Koike — art supervision, direction, and design
 Henry Diltz, Dan Garson, Baron Wolman — photography

References

Woodstock Festival
Rhino Records live albums
2019 live albums
Various artists albums